First-seeded Margaret Smith defeated Jan Lehane 6–1, 6–4 in the final to win the women's singles tennis title at the 1961 Australian Championships.

Seeds
The seeded players are listed below. Margaret Smith is the champion; others show the round in which they were eliminated.

 Margaret Smith (champion)
 Jan Lehane (finalist)
 Lesley Turner (third round)
 Mary Carter Reitano (semifinals)
 Mary Bevis Hawton (quarterfinals)
 Maureen Pratt (third round)
 Lorraine Coghlan (quarterfinals)
 Beverley Rae (third round)

Draw

Key
 Q = Qualifier
 WC = Wild card
 LL = Lucky loser
 r = Retired

Finals

Earlier rounds

Section 1

Section 2

Section 3

Section 4

External links
 1961 Australian Championships on ITFtennis.com, the source for this draw

1961 in women's tennis
1961
1961 in Australian tennis
1961 in Australian women's sport